Wabag Urban LLG is a local-level government (LLG) of Enga Province, Papua New Guinea.

Wards
80. Wabag Urban

References

Local-level governments of Enga Province